Qushchi (also Romanized as Qūshchī; also known as Qūshehī) is a village in Abarghan Rural District, in the Central District of Sarab County, East Azerbaijan Province, Iran. At the 2006 census, its population was 923, in 191 families.

References 

Populated places in Sarab County